Paúles de Lara is a village in the municipality of Jurisdicción de Lara, located southeast of the province of Burgos, belonging to the autonomous community of Castilla y León (Spain).  It is situated 40 km from the capital, Burgos.

Towns in Spain
Populated places in the Province of Burgos